The fraternal myotis (Myotis frater) is a species of vesper bat native to East Asia.

Taxonomy 
The long-tailed myotis (M. longicaudatus) was split as a distinct species by a 2015 study based on molecular evidence. This has also been followed by the American Society of Mammalogists, the IUCN Red List, and the ITIS. Phylogenetic evidence supports the reddish myotis (M. soror) of Taiwan being the sister species to M. frater.

Description 
An adult fraternal myotis has a body length of about 5 cm, a tail of about 4.5 cm, and a wing span of about 3.8 cm.

Distribution
The species is found throughout China and Taiwan. Bats that could potentially belong to this species have also been collected in Uttarkhand, India, but their taxonomy remains unresolved.

Status 
There are no major threats to this species, although it may be threatened by roadkill in Taiwan. It may be sensitive to climate change, but this was based on the old classification that included M. longicaudatus within the species, and thus this remains unconfirmed.

References
Notes

Sources

Mouse-eared bats
Taxa named by Glover Morrill Allen
Mammals of China
Mammals of Taiwan
Mammals described in 1923
Bats of Asia